Salem Parkway may refer to:

 Oregon Route 99E Business 
 Salem Parkway (North Carolina)